Lubarsky is a surname. Notable people with the surname include:

Aaron Lubarsky, American documentary filmmaker
Hal Lubarsky, American poker player

See also
Meanings of minor planet names: 2001–3000#318